The Nissan Diesel Space Dream (Kana: 日産ディーゼル・スペースドリーム) is a heavy-duty double-deck tourist coach produced by the Japanese manufacturer Nissan Diesel in the 1980s.

Space Dream (1983-1988) 
The Space Dream was introduced at the 1983 Tokyo Motor Show, where it was fitted with a Fuji Heavy Industries body. It uses a RE10 engine.

Jonckheere-bodied double-decker bus (1993-2000) 
The Nissan Diesel second generation double-decker bus was introduced in 1993, with a new double-decker bus chassis, which was developed from Nissan Diesel Space Wing tri-axle, the new generation bus was fitted with Jonckheere Monaco body. It originally used the RF10 engine, now uses the RH8 engine.

External links 

Double-decker buses
Coaches (bus)
Vehicles introduced in 1983
Space Dream